Miloš Ožegović (born 11 May 1992) is a Serbian football midfielder who plays for Mladost Novi Sad.

Career

Dolina Padina
Playing for Dolina Padina, Ožegović made 33 League Vojvodina appearances for 2 seasons.

Dinamo Pančevo
After left Dolina, Ožegović moved in Dinamo Pančevo, where he scored 2 goals on 26 appearances in the League Vojvodina. After the end of season, he left the club from Pančevo.

Radnik Surdulica
For 2013–14 season, Miloš played in the Serbian First League with Radnik Surdulica. He made 25 appearances and scored 1 goal, against Mladost Lučani. He left the club after ended season.

Donji Srem
Miloš Ožegović joined Donji Srem for the 2014–15 season together with Abdul Rashid Obuobi, but he was loaned to Mačva Šabac later.

Loaning to Mačva Šabac
Ožegović made 5 appearances playing for Mačva Šabac, as a loaned player of Donji Srem.

Sinđelić Beograd
Next club in Ožegović's career was a Sinđelić Beograd. He had 13 caps until the end of 2014–15 season.

Jagodina
In the summer of 2015, Ožegović signed with Jagodina, but due to administrative problems gained the right to play in 3rd fixture of 2015–16 season, when he made his SuperLiga debut.

Career statistics

References

External links
 
 Miloš Ožegović stats at utakmica.rs 
 

1992 births
Living people
Sportspeople from Pančevo
Association football midfielders
Serbian footballers
Serbian expatriate footballers
FK Dolina Padina players
FK Dinamo Pančevo players
FK Radnik Surdulica players
FK Donji Srem players
FK Mačva Šabac players
FK Sinđelić Beograd players
FK Jagodina players
FK Radnički Pirot players
Knattspyrnufélagið Víkingur players
FK Dinamo Vranje players
FK Napredak Kruševac players
FK Mladost Lučani players
Serbian SuperLiga players
Serbian First League players
Expatriate footballers in Iceland
Serbian expatriate sportspeople in Iceland